Łaszczyn may refer to the following places:
Łaszczyn, Greater Poland Voivodeship (west-central Poland)
Łaszczyn, Łódź Voivodeship (central Poland)
Łaszczyn, Masovian Voivodeship (east-central Poland)